Denisia nubilosella is a moth of the family Oecophoridae. It is found in France, Italy, Switzerland, Austria, the Czech Republic, Slovakia, Poland and Romania.

The wingspan is 17 mm.

References

Moths described in 1854
Oecophoridae
Moths of Europe